Juncus canadensis, called the Canadian rush, is a species of flowering plant in the genus Juncus, native to central and eastern Canada and the central and eastern United States, and introduced to Oregon, New Zealand, and the Low Countries in Europe. It is an obligate wetland species.

References

canadensis
Flora of Eastern North America
Plants described in 1825